Daryl Bourke (born 7 April 1965) is a former Australian rules footballer who played with Melbourne in the Victorian Football League (VFL) during the 1980s.

A centreman, Bourke played nine games in each of his two seasons at Melbourne. He then joined the Brisbane Bears for their inaugural VFL season in 1987 but couldn't break into the team. Instead he became a leading player in the Queensland Australian Football League, with Morningside.

He had a knee reconstruction in 1988, his first year as captain, but played some of the best football of his career a year later to win the Grogan Medal. In 1991 he captained Morningside to a premiership and participated in two further premierships in 1993 and 1994. He gave up the captaincy in 1993 to become assistant playing coach and won another Grogan Medal that year, in a three-way tie, to become the first Morningside player to win it twice. When he finally retired as a player he had amassed 187 QAFL games, with eight top two finishes in his club's "Best and Fairest", including three wins. He also represented Queensland on ten occasions.

References

External links
DemonWiki profile

1965 births
Australian rules footballers from Victoria (Australia)
Melbourne Football Club players
Morningside Australian Football Club players
Kyabram Football Club players
Living people